Ángel Jiménez Gallego (born 22 June 2002) is a Spanish professional footballer who plays as a goalkeeper for Club Recreativo Granada.

Club career
Born in Granada, Andalusia, Jiménez joined hometown side Granada CF's youth setup in 2013, aged just 11. On 8 November 2020, before even having appeared with the reserves, he made his first team – and La Liga – debut by starting and saving a penalty in a 0–2 away loss against Real Sociedad, as his side was heavily impacted by the COVID-19 pandemic; at the age of 18 years, four months and 16 days, he became the youngest player to debut in the top tier with the club, overcoming previous record holder Adalberto Peñaranda.

Career statistics

Club

References

External links

2002 births
Living people
Footballers from Granada
Spanish footballers
Association football goalkeepers
La Liga players
Segunda División B players
Segunda Federación players
Granada CF footballers
Club Recreativo Granada players